Ahmetli is a town and district of Manisa Province in the Aegean region of Turkey. According to the 2000 census, population of the district is 18,852 of which 11,011 live in the town of Ahmetli.

History 
By the end of Greek Invasion of Anatolia, Ahmetli and all its surrounding villages were burned by the retreating Greek forces. The Greek soldier Giannis Koutsonicolas from Arahova describes the events with the following words;

Notes

References

External links
 District governor's official website 
 Road map of Ahmetli and environs
 Various images of Ahmetli, Manisa

Towns in Turkey
Populated places in Manisa Province
Districts of Manisa Province